Hücker Moor is a lake in , Spenge, Kreis Herford, North Rhine-Westphalia, Germany. At an elevation of 62.7 m, its surface area is 10.9 ha.

References 

Lakes of North Rhine-Westphalia
LHucker Moor
Bogs of North Rhine-Westphalia